Oboafo Kwadjo Asante (born June 21, 1977) is a Ghanaian politician and businessman. He is the Member of parliament for the Suhum (Ghana parliament constituency).

Early life 
Oboafo was born on June 21, 1977. He hails from Akropong Akuapem in the Eastern Region of Ghana.

Education 
Oboafo' has a bachelor in education degree in Science (Chemistry), a diploma in science education, a Post Graduate Diploma in Business Analytics (PGDBA) and a Master of Business Administration (Finance).

Career 
Oboafo Kwadjo is the managing director Kay and Moby Company Limited.

Politics 
In 2020 he contested and won the NPP parliamentary primaries for Suhum (Ghana parliament constituency) in the Eastern Region of Ghana.
He won the parliamentary seat in the 2020 Ghanaian general election. He serves as a member of the Defence and Interior Committee of parliament.

Personal life 
Oboafo is a Christian.

References 

1977 births
Living people
New Patriotic Party politicians
Ghanaian Christians
People from Eastern Region (Ghana)
Ghanaian MPs 2021–2025